Disodium 4,4′-dinitrostilbene-2,2′-disulfonate is an organic compound with the formula (O2NC6H3(SO3Na)CH)2. This salt is a common precursor to a variety of textile dyes and optical brighteners

Preparation and reactions
The synthesis of disodium 4,4′-dinitrostilbene-2,2′-disulfonate begins with sulfonation of 4-nitrotoluene. This reaction affords 4-nitrotoluene-2-sulfonic acid.  Oxidation of this species with sodium hypochlorite yields the disodium salt of 4,4′-dinitrostilbene-2,2′-disulfonic acid.   The product is useful as its reaction with aniline derivatives results in the formation of azo dyes.  Commercially important dyes derived from this compound include Direct Red 76, Direct Brown 78, and Direct Orange 40. Reduction gives 4,4′-diamino-2,2′-stilbenedisulfonic acid, which is a common optical brightener.

History
Arthur Green and André Wahl first reported the formation of disodium 4,4'-dinitrostilbene-2,2'-disulfonate using sodium hypochlorite.

References

Benzenesulfonates
Azo compounds
Stilbenoids
Organic sodium salts